Andrei Sebastian Borza (born 12 November 2005) is a Romanian professional footballer who plays as a left-back for Liga I club Farul Constanța.

Club career
Borza made his Liga I debut for Farul Constanța on 1 May 2022, starting in a 0–1 away loss to four-time defending champions CFR Cluj. On 28 October that year, he scored his first goal in a 2–1 league win at FC U Craiova.

Career statistics

Club

References

External links

2005 births
Living people
People from Năvodari
Romanian footballers
Association football fullbacks
Liga I players
FCV Farul Constanța players
Romania youth international footballers